tvN10 Awards is an award ceremony for excellence in television in South Korea, organized by tvN, one of the networks under the umbrella of CJ E&M. It was held at the KINTEX in Ilsanseo-gu, Goyang, Gyeonggi Province and was emceed by Kang Ho-dong and Shin Dong-yup on October 9, 2016.

Background
A part of "tvN10 Festival", the inaugural ceremony was a celebration of 10 years of broadcasting by cable network tvN. The nominees were chosen from dramas, comedy shows and variety shows that aired on tvN from October 2006 to September 2016.

Nominations and winners
(Winners denoted in bold)

Presenters

Special performances

See also

 List of Asian television awards

References

External links
 

South Korean television awards
Awards established in 2016
2016 television awards
TVN (South Korean TV channel) original programming
2016 in South Korea